Alan Zaleski was a member of the Ohio Senate from 1982 to 1998, representing the 13th District, which encompasses much of Lorain County, Ohio. By 1998, Zaleski faced term limits, and was subsequently succeeded by Jeff Armbruster, a Republican.

References

External links

Republican Party Ohio state senators
Living people
Year of birth missing (living people)